KMQ viewer are glasses for viewing a stereoscopic over/under format. KMQ was invented in the 1980s by a team of three physicists. KMQ stands for the inventors' initials: Koschnitzke, Mehnert, Quick. A recent usage of this technique is the openKMQ project.

Principle
An image pair is placed one above one another. The prismatic viewer tilts the right eyesight slightly up and the left eyesight slightly down.

Stereoscopic viewing is achieved at a matching distance to the glasses. When placing the right view on top of a (letter/A4 size) paper and the left view below, viewing from arm length distance (ca. 50 cm) creates a stereo experience. Bigger over/under stereo image pairs on either paper or a monitor can be viewed from a proportional greater distance. In general, the prisms achieve a 19° viewing angle.

References

External links
Open Hardware/Software project for the KMQ prismatic stereo viewer

Stereoscopy